Adrian Davies (born 9 February 1969 in Bridgend) is a former Wales international rugby union player. A fly-half, he played for Wales in the 1991 and 1995 Rugby World Cup finals.

References

External links

Clear Partners - current business
profile at scrum.com

Welsh rugby union players
Wales international rugby union players
1969 births
Alumni of Robinson College, Cambridge
Cardiff RFC players
Rugby union players from Bridgend
Rugby union fly-halves
Living people